KNET may refer to:

 KNET-CD, a low-power television station (channel 25) licensed to Los Angeles, California, United States
 KNET (AM), a radio station (1450 AM) licensed to Palestine, Texas, United States
 Network-management software for KDE and Linux